Collins Dauda (born 13 February 1957) is a teacher, politician, former Ghanaian Minister for Lands and Natural Resources; and Water Resources, Works and Housing.

Early life and education
Collins Dauda was born on 13 February 1957 in Mehame in the Ahafo region (formerly, Brong Ahafo Region). He hails from Mehame in the Brong-Ahafo Region of Ghana. His parents were Issaka Naaba and Mariama Issah. His secondary education was at Mim Senior High School where he obtained both the GCE Ordinary Level and the GCE Advanced Level between 1973 and 1981.

Career
Dauda taught at the Kukuom Agricultural Senior High School from 1985. In 1986, he joined the teaching staff at the Ahafoman Senior High School where he continued to teach until 1992.

Politics
Dauda became a member of the Asutifi District Assembly between 1978 and 1981. He was a member of the Consultative Assembly, that drew up the 1992 Ghana constitution between 1991 and 1992. He was first elected to parliament in the 1992 parliamentary election on the ticket of the National Democratic Congress making him the first MP for the Asutifi South constituency in the Fourth Republic. He won a second term in the 1996 parliamentary election. He however lost his seat in 2000 parliamentary election due to an allegation that he'd used black magic to kill his political rival Prof. Gyan-Amoah just a day before the general elections. He however regained the seat in 2004. He has maintained the seat from the 4th to the 7th parliament of the 4th republic.  During 2002 and 2004 when he was out of parliament, he was the Regional Chairman of the National Democratic Congress (NDC) in the Brong Ahafo Region. From February 2009 to 2016, Collins Dauda was appointed Minister for Lands and Mineral Resources and reshuffled to the Ministry of Water Resources, Works and Housing. He was also the Vice president of the committee on Lands and Forestry between 1994 and 1996. He later became chairman of the same committee between 1997 and 2000 and also served as member of the Finance and Youth, Sports and Culture Committees.

Elections
Dauda was elected for the 3rd time as the member of parliament for the Asutifi South constituency of the Brong Ahafo Region in the 2004 Ghanaian general elections. He thus represented the constituency in the 4th parliament of the 4th republic of Ghana. He won on the ticket of the National Democratic Congress. His constituency was a part of the 10 parliamentary seats out of 24 seats won by the National Democratic Congress in that election for the Brong Ahafo Region. The Asutifi South constituency saw a ‘skirt and blouse’ voting by electorates in that election as the presidential candidate elected by the constituency electorates was John Kufour of the major opposition New Patriotic Party. The National Democratic Congress won a minority total of 94 parliamentary seats out of 230 seats. Dauda was elected with 9,668 votes out of 18700 total valid votes cast, equivalent to 51.70% of total valid votes cast. He was elected over Thomas Broni of the New Patriotic Party, Nana Nsiah Ababio Williams Cosmus of the People's National Convention and Adu Adjei Augustine of the Convention People's Party. These obtained 46.90%, 1.20% and 0.30% respectively of total valid votes cast.

In the 2008 Ghanaian general elections, Dauda was elected for the 4th time as the member of parliament for the Asutifi South constituency. He continued to represent the constituency in the 5th parliament of the 4th republic of Ghana. He won on the ticket of the National Democratic Congress. His constituency was part of the majority total of 114 parliamentary seats out of 230 seats in that election. Dauda was elected with 10,984votes out of 22,032total valid votes cast, equivalent to 49.85% of total valid votes cast. He was elected over Yiadom Boakye of the New Patriotic Party and Okyere George of the Democratic People's Party. These obtained 49.79% and 0.35% of total valid votes cast respectively. He was re-elected by his constituents in the 2020 General election, to represent them in the 8th Parliament of the Fourth Republic of Ghana.

Committees 
Dauda is a member of the Finance committee, also a member of the Lands and Forestry Committee and also a member of Committee of Selection Committee.

Ethnocentric comment
In August 2016, Dauda in addressing party supporters at Koforidua said that the then opposition New Patriotic Party had a long history of discriminating against Zongo people and that "We should let them know that we are not with them".

Personal life
Dauda is married with two wives and eleven children. He is a Muslim.

See also 
List of Mills government ministers
Asutifi South (Ghana parliament constituency)

References

External links and sources
Profile on Ghana government website
Profile on GhanaDistricts.com

1957 births
Living people
Ghanaian Muslims
Ghanaian MPs 1993–1997
Ghanaian MPs 1997–2001
Ghanaian MPs 2005–2009
Ghanaian MPs 2009–2013
Ghanaian MPs 2013–2017
Ghanaian MPs 2017–2021
Government ministers of Ghana
Ghanaian educators
National Democratic Congress (Ghana) politicians
Ghanaian civil servants
Ghanaian MPs 2021–2025
Ghanaian politicians